KidsOut is a small charity based in Leighton Buzzard which provides a range of services to bring about positive change to thousands of disadvantaged children around the U.K. It uniquely centers on the charities actions rather than the child's circumstances, commonly the Fun and Happiness brought to children. Every year they help over 35,000 children who may have escaped domestic violence, come from difficult backgrounds, have been excluded from school, have a life-limiting disability or have been socially or rurally isolated.

The small staff base enables it to remain efficient while growing service coverage. The current CEO of KidsOut is, Gordon Moulds, who was appointed Director of Fundraising in December 2011 moving to the post of Chief Executive from July 2012. The charity is governed by a board of 18 Trustees and is also supported by 18 Ambassadors and 2 Patrons, John Parrott and John Peters.

History

In 1989, John Moores, who was the founder of the Littlewoods Organisation, developed an event which he called “The Liverpool Annual Motorists Outing for Disabled Children.” This was organised by staff at the Littlewoods head office in Liverpool. To expand this event out across the U.K Littlewoods needed to link in with a suitable organisation. His daughter, Lady Grantchester, spoke with Peter Jarvis, a Rotarian of Kingston, to meet with John Moores. John Moores agreed to organise a trail day out in Kingston June 1990, if successful Littlewoods would support the rollout across the country. The event proved to be a great success and the rollout of Days Out soon followed. On 9 June 1992, 34 Rotary Clubs throughout England, Wales and Scotland had successful and enjoyable outings. Peter coined the name “KidsOut” and devised a logo. In time, the Moores family sold Littlewoods and the link with KidsOut was lost. In 1999, KidsOut was registered as a charity and Rotarian Peter Jarvis became one of the founding trustees.

Services

KidsOut delivers 5 major U.K services to disadvantaged children with the support of dozens of companies. They also organise Fun Days, where children are taken on a Fun Day out to different attractions, and Workshops, aimed at engaging and developing a child in a particular way, throughout the year.

The Day Out
Every June, the Rotary Organisation throughout Britain and Ireland together with KidsOut takes over 25,000 disadvantaged children on a day out where they may visit the seaside, theme parks, adventure playgrounds & zoos.

Toy Box
Working with Women's Aid Refuges across the UK, KidsOut provides the children with a box of toys when they leave with their mum and move into their new home.

Fun Days
Launched in 2012, Fun Days takes disadvantaged children across the UK on a fun day out and helps them remember what it is like to just be children. Whether a trip to the theatre or a day at a theme park, Fun Days gives them something to look forward to and happy memories they can look back on.

Since the start of the project, tens of thousands of children have gone on a Fun Day. While KidsOut supports children from a range of backgrounds, including those living with critical health issues, in economic hardship or with a disability, some of our most vulnerable beneficiaries are children that have fled domestic abuse for the safety of a refuge. Having experienced domestic violence either directly or witnessed it repeatedly at home, these children live with many emotional and economic challenges. KidsOut is the only national children’s charity focusing directly on their needs and working to bring fun and happiness back into their lives.

Phyzzpod
Selected schools are given a Sensory Room, to develop cognitive, communication and language skills in children.

World Stories
A vast collection of online short stories available in many different languages to help children improve their literacy skills and learn about other cultures.

References

Children's charities based in the United Kingdom
Charities based in Bedfordshire
1999 establishments in England
Organizations established in 1999